Mikhail Vyacheslavovich Nekrasov (born 17 September 1980) is a former Russian professional footballer.

Club career
He played 5 seasons in the Russian Football National League for FC Neftekhimik Nizhnekamsk and FC Avangard Kursk.

External links
 
 

1980 births
Living people
Russian footballers
Association football midfielders
FC Sodovik Sterlitamak players
FC Avangard Kursk players
FC Neftekhimik Nizhnekamsk players
FC Sever Murmansk players
Latvian Higher League players
Russian expatriate footballers
Expatriate footballers in Latvia
Russian expatriate sportspeople in Latvia